Acoustics is the sixth studio album by American rock band Floater, released on August 3, 2004 and consisting entirely of original acoustic songs. Drummer Peter Cornett sang lead vocals on Invisible, which also featured guitarist Dave Amador on trumpet.

Track listing
"On the Table" – 3:33
"Lost Patience" – 2:11
"Time Marches On" – 4:27
"Out of Sight" – 4:27
"Hard Parting" – 1:36
"The Golden Age" – 2:40
"Accepted" – 2:47
"Invisible" – 1:55
"Bound for Glory" – 3:52
"Strychnine" – 3:46
"The Misfit's Song" – 4:42
"Evangeline" – 4:01

References

[ AMG]

2004 albums
Floater (band) albums
Elemental Records albums